Hiyam Qablan (sometimes Hiam Kablan) (born 1956) is a Palestinian poet and short story writer.

Biography
Qablan was born in the village of Isfiya, and received her primary education at the village school; for high school she went to Nazareth, where she attended the Franciscan Sisters' School. At Haifa University she studied history and education. She lives in Daliyat al-Karmel, where she has worked as an Arabic teacher. Some of her poetry has been translated into Hebrew; she has also written a regular column, "Ala ajnihat al-rish" ("On the Wings of a Feather"), in al-Sinnara. She has published several volumes of verse and short fiction, beginning with Amal 'ala al-durub (Hops on the Roads) in 1975. She is a regular attendee of poetry festivals, including that held at Sde Boker College.

References

1956 births
Living people
Palestinian women poets
Palestinian women short story writers
Palestinian poets
Palestinian short story writers
20th-century poets
20th-century short story writers
21st-century poets
21st-century short story writers
People from Isfiya
University of Haifa alumni
20th-century Palestinian writers
21st-century Palestinian writers
20th-century Palestinian women writers
21st-century Palestinian women writers